West Oaks Mall may refer to:

 West Oaks Mall (Houston), a shopping mall in Houston, Texas, United States
 West Oaks Mall (Orlando), a shopping mall in Ocoee, Florida, United States